Saskatoon Nutana South was a provincial electoral district for the Legislative Assembly of Saskatchewan, Canada. This district was located in the southeast corner of Saskatoon. 

It was created for the 16th Saskatchewan general election out of part of the five-seat Saskatoon City riding. It was abolished in 1975 into Saskatoon Buena Vista and Saskatoon Eastview.

Members of the Legislative Assembly

Election results

|-
 
| style="width: 130px" |NDP
|Herman Rolfes
|align="right"|5,260
|align="right"|52.34
|align="right"|+17.56

|- bgcolor="white"
!align="left" colspan=3|Total
!align="right"|10,049
!align="right"|100.00
!align="right"|

|-

 
|NDP
|Adele Smillie
|align="right"|3,445
|align="right"|34.78
|align="right"|*
 
|Prog. Conservative
|Peter Ritchie
|align="right"|1,267
|align="right"|12.79
|align="right"|*
|- bgcolor="white"
!align="left" colspan=3|Total
!align="right"|9,905
!align="right"|100.00
!align="right"|

References

External links 
Website of the Legislative Assembly of Saskatchewan
Saskatchewan Archives Board – Provincial Election Results By Electoral Division

Former provincial electoral districts of Saskatchewan
Politics of Saskatoon